Hill City Township is a township in Graham County, Kansas, USA.  As of the 2000 census, its population was 1,747.

Geography
According to the USGS, it contains one cemetery, Hill City Cemetery, located a tiny distance north of central Hill City. Another cemetery, Memorial Lawn Cemetery, lies one mile (1.6 km) north of Hill City along U.S. Route 283, just south of Hill City Cemetery.

Transportation
Hill City Township contains one airport or landing strip, Hill City Municipal Airport.

References

External links
 USGS Geographic Names Information System (GNIS)
 US-Counties.com
 City-Data.com

Townships in Graham County, Kansas
Townships in Kansas